Are You Smarter than a 5th Grader? is an American quiz game show. It originally aired on Fox where it was hosted by Jeff Foxworthy. It is produced by Mark Burnett. The show premiered as a three-day special which began on February 27, 2007, with the first two shows each a half-hour in length. Regular one-hour episodes began airing Thursdays from March 1 through May 10, and the first season continued with new episodes beginning May 31. Are You Smarter Than a 5th Grader? was picked up for the 2007–08 season, which began on September 6, 2007, and aired in the same timeslot. Following the end of the original run of the primetime version on September 18, 2009, a first-run syndicated version of the show ran from September 2009 to May 2011, with Foxworthy returning as host.  On May 26, 2015, the program returned to Fox for a new, 4th season, with Foxworthy, again, returning as host. On February 14, 2019, it was announced that the program would be revived on Nickelodeon with new host John Cena, airing from June 10 to November 3, 2019.

5th Grader games are played by a single contestant, who attempts to answer ten questions (plus a final bonus question). Content is taken from elementary school textbooks, two from each grade level from first to fifth. Each correct answer increases the amount of money the player banks; a maximum cash prize of $1 million can be won on the Fox version, $250,000 in the syndicated version, and $100,000 on the Nickelodeon version. Along the way, contestants can be assisted by a "classmate", one of five school-age cast members, in answering the questions. Notably, upon getting an answer incorrect or deciding to prematurely end the game, contestants must state that they are "not smarter than a 5th grader."

Two people have won the $1 million prize: Kathy Cox, superintendent of public schools for the U.S. state of Georgia; and George Smoot, winner of the 2006 Nobel Prize in Physics and professor at the University of California, Berkeley.

One person has won the $100,000 prize on the Nickelodeon revival: Alfred Guy, a college dean at Yale University.

The show also airs internationally, and the format has been picked up for local versions in a number of other countries.

Production

"Are You Smarter than a 5th Grader" was originally created as a recurring segment on the Howard Stern Show although Stern was given no credit or mention for the TV series. In November 2006 it was pitched as "Do You Remember Grade School?" by Burnett and Zoo Productions to network executives in the form of a six-question quiz; the only network president who was able to win on the quiz was Fox's Peter Liguori. On January 31, 2007, Fox announced that they had picked up the show for an initial six-episode run, and on February 9 Foxworthy was announced as host. Less than eight weeks after being pitched, the first episode aired.

On November 6, 2014, Fox announced it would revive the series, with a new generation of fifth-graders, to its lineup as part of the summer season of the 2014–15 season. The new season features several changes, including a new panel of six regular fifth-grade students (whose usage & seating positions will rotate per episode), a new "Grade School Giveaway" feature on the $10,000 question, in which a school will win $10,000 towards improvements if the contestant answers their $10,000 question correctly, and the million dollar question is now from the sixth grade. Foxworthy explained that the revival was the result of a conversation he had over dinner with Mark Burnett the previous year, in which he considered 5th Grader to be his favorite television role. When Fox approached him later in 2014 about reviving the series, he accepted the role with little hesitation.

Original and revival versions on Fox

Gameplay
In each game, the contestant (an adult) is asked a series of 11 questions, spanning ten subjects (such as Animal Science, Spelling or Math) taken from textbooks for first through fifth grade students. Each question is associated with a grade level; there are two questions per grade, from first to fifth. The player can answer the questions (either true/false, a three-answered multiple-choice question, or short-answered question) in any order; contestants lock in their answers by pressing the button on the podium, and each correct answer raises their cumulative amount of winnings to the next level (see table at right; the question's value determines its difficulty, regardless of grade level); after answering the fifth question correctly, they are guaranteed to leave with at least $25,000. If the player correctly answers the first 10 questions, they are given the opportunity to answer a fifth-grade bonus question (sixth-grade in the 2015 revival) worth $1 million (see "Million Dollar Question" below). The prize money and the board layout is as follows:

Money Ladder
Board Layout

Five fifth graders (some of whom are also professional child actors) appear on each show and play along on stage – in general, each episode in a season has the same cast of children. Prior to the show, the children are provided with workbooks which contain a variety of material, some of which could be used in the questions asked in the game. The player chooses one to be their "classmate", who stands at the adjacent podium and is called upon for assistance in choosing a subject; the other four sit at desks off to the side. Each child acts as the classmate for two consecutive questions, after which another child is picked from those who have not yet played in that game.

If the contestant gets an answer incorrect (and while the classmate also answer incorrectly (see "Cheats" below)), the contestant will "flunk out" and leave with either nothing, or $25,000 if they correctly answered the fifth question. The contestant may choose to "drop out" at any point during the game (with the exception of the peek cheat noted above), which entitles them to leave the game with any winnings they have accrued.

Cheats
Contestants have three forms of answer-assistance options (two cheats and a Save), each available for use once per game (up to, but not including, the bonus question). The two cheats, Peek and Copy, can be invoked by the contestant to aid in making a decision as follows:
Peek: The contestant is shown their classmate's answer, and may use it or give a different one. When this cheat is used, the contestant may not "drop out" on the current question.
Copy: The contestant is locked into using their classmate's answer, without being able to see it first. The classmate must provide the correct answer in order for the contestant to advance to the next stage; otherwise, the contestant flunks out. When this cheat is used in the 2015 revival, the classmate is allowed to discuss his/her answer with the other fifth graders and change it if desired. 
Save: If the contestant misses a question and the classmate has answered correctly, the contestant is credited with a correct answer and allowed to continue in the game. The contestant cannot choose to use the Save; it is automatically deployed on their first wrong answer. If the classmate has also missed the question, the contestant flunks out. By using the Peek first, a contestant could have two possible answers to a question – their own, then the classmate's with the Save if needed. The Save was removed from the syndicated version beginning in Season 2, and does not apply in the Nickelodeon version since wrong answers carry no penalty.

Once all three forms of assistance are used or once the tenth question is answered correctly, whichever comes first, the classmates must return to the tables and take no further active role in the game.

Classroom Club
"Classroom Club" questions were introduced into the game at the beginning of the second season. These questions are written by elementary school students, who submit them via the show's Web site. When one is used, the school of the student who wrote it receives a computer lab, courtesy of the show.

Field Trip
"Field Trip" questions, introduced in the third season, feature a video clip of a National Geographic Channel correspondent asking the question from an appropriate location somewhere in the world.

Grade School Giveaway
In the 2015 revival, the $10,000 question also rewarded $10,000 to a grade school (connected to the studio via Skype) towards refurbishments and improvements if the contestant answered correctly.

Million Dollar Question
A contestant who successfully answered all ten questions was given the subject for an eleventh one, at the fifth-grade level on the original or sixth-grade in the 2015 revival. They had to decide whether to attempt it, or drop out and keep the $500,000 won to that point. If the contestant chose to attempt the final question, they had to answer it with no help from the students and could not drop out. A correct answer increased their winnings total to $1 million, while a miss reduced it to $25,000.

Any contestant who won the $1 million top prize was allowed to face the camera and state, "I am smarter than a 5th grader." Contestants who dropped out or flunked out at any point in the game had to face the camera and declare, "I am not smarter than a 5th grader."

Casting
Each season, a new group of children are cast to appear as the "classmates" on the show. Any child cast must be "smart, funny, and outgoing", and must actually be in the 5th grade (age 9, 10 or 11) during the television season finales.

Contestants who make it through the auditioning process are required to sign a one-year contract stating that they will not tell anybody how much money they make, and that they cannot tell or release any information about the actual auditioning process, such as the number of screening processes, the questions asked by the auditioners, and the actual credit for being accepted onto the show.

During every classmate's final appearance on the show ("Graduation Night"), each classmate receives a $25,000 savings bond.

Celebrity Are You Smarter than a 5th Grader?
Beginning in season 2, many celebrities played the game and donated their winnings to the charity of their choice. Of these celebrities, Nobel Prize winner George Smoot was the most successful celebrity upon becoming the second contestant to win the $1 million top prize. A few other celebrities won $500,000 for their charities, which include Gene Simmons who played for Glazer Pediatrics AIDS Foundation, and former Jeopardy! champion Ken Jennings, which allowed him to reclaim the record for the most money won on American game shows.

Syndicated version

A half-hour daily syndicated version of the show, also with Foxworthy as host, began airing on September 21, 2009, for season 1, and Season 2 premiered on September 20, 2010. This version features a top prize of $250,000 and a tweaked format between the prime time version and the daytime version.

On March 24, 2011, the show was canceled along with Don't Forget the Lyrics! due to low ratings. Reruns continued on several cable outlets for a year afterward, as well as Light TV until the network dissolved in January 2021.

On the syndicated version, each class had three kids in each episode, but there were nine kids who traded off with one another throughout both seasons. They were, as reflected in the table below:

Gameplay

The game play for this version of 5th Grader is similar to the original Fox network version. Games are played by a single contestant, who attempts to answer questions correctly plus one final fifth grade bonus question with the assistance of one of three fifth grade classmates (instead of five on the network version), who vary each week. In addition, each classmate can be used for up to three questions (as opposed to two on the network version). Naturally, the question's grade level determines the value and difficulty.

Contestants are required to attempt all questions, and do not flunk out simply by answering a question incorrectly, instead losing all money earned to that point. If a player has any money left after all questions are asked, they are given the choice to either drop out with the money earned, or answer a 5th-grade bonus question worth 10 times their earnings. The maximum winnings are $25,000 without the bonus question, and therefore $250,000 if it is answered correctly.

If the contestant answers the bonus question wrong, they lose everything, but if they had earned at least $2,500 before the bonus question, then they receive a consolation prize in the form of a $2,500 prepaid card. If they had earned less than $2,500, the value of the card is $250. On celebrity episodes, the consolation prizes are cash donations to the celebrity's favorite charity.

In Season 1, there are 10 regular questions before the bonus question. Season 2 shortened the game by reducing the number of questions before the bonus question down to eight while fifth grade questions are removed from the main game. The "Save" was also removed, and contestants were no longer allowed to skip to a higher-grade question before attempting at least one question from each lower grade.

Nickelodeon version
A revival debuted on Nickelodeon on June 10, 2019, hosted by John Cena. The first episode was released as a preview to YouTube by Nickelodeon on June 6, 2019. As in previous versions, the game is played by a single adult contestant. The top prize on this version is $100,000.

The contestant faces a total of 11 questions in his or her game. The first six questions cover first through fourth grade, with one question each for first and second grades, and two questions each for third and fourth grades. Each classmate is allowed to help in one grade level. The contestant is allowed a "Peek" and a "Copy" during the first part of the game. If a contestant gives an incorrect answer, the top prize is lowered; correspondingly, the "Save" is not given in this version. The money grows as follows:

Fifth Grade
Once the first part of the game is completed, the contestant faces the fifth grade. Five subjects are shown to the contestant, each with one fifth grade-level question. The contestant is given 60 seconds to answer all five questions. As in the first part of the game, the contestant must press the button on his or her desk to lock in an answer.

To help the contestant, one "final cheat" is allowed, which the contestant can use on any question; the final cheat allows the contestant to discuss that question with the last remaining member of the class (without a stated time limit) after the other four questions have been completed and their answers revealed. Cena does not move on to the next question until the contestant has acted on the current question by either answering, passing, or declaring an intention to use the final cheat. Any passed question will be repeated with the remaining time.

After all of the questions have been answered, or time has expired, the questions that have been answered are reviewed, and the correct answers revealed. If the contestant has used the final cheat, that question is then addressed last after the other four questions have been resolved. The contestant is then allowed to discuss that question with the last remaining classmate. Once the discussion is over, the contestant locks in an answer to that question, and is then told whether the answer is right or wrong.

Each correct answer increases the multiplier by one (for example, two correct answers would be three times the bank; a $10,000 bank worth a total of $30,000); correctly answering every five fifth-grade questions correctly increases the initial bank by ten.

As in the original versions, winning the maximum prize of $100,000 entitled a contestant to confess to a camera that "I am smarter than a 5th grader!"; if the contestant did not win the full $100,000, they instead have to declare the statement: "I am not smarter than a 5th grader."

Cast
The following is the cast for the Nickelodeon version:

Chloe Casanova
Quinne Daniels
Nick D'Ambrosio
Patrick D'Amico
Colin Heintz
Amira Martin
Isabella Schmitt
Cooper Stutler
Mia Tillman
Tristan Tucker Jr.
Jamir Vega
Saya Watkins

Reception

Critical
David Hinckley of the New York Daily News gave the 2015 revival series' cast a positive review, calling the classmates "terrific... smart, outgoing and funny," while arguing that Foxworthy "understands how much to showcase them."

Ratings
The first season of the original series averaged 11.5 million viewers. The 2015 revival premiered on May 26, 2015, to 3.31 million viewers, scoring a 0.8/3 rating/share among adults 18–49.

Notes

References

External links
 
 
 

2007 American television series debuts
2009 American television series endings
2009 American television series debuts
2011 American television series endings
2015 American television series debuts
2015 American television series endings
2019 American television series debuts
2019 American television series endings
2000s American game shows
2010s American game shows
2010s American children's game shows
Are You Smarter than a 5th Grader?
Fox Broadcasting Company original programming
2010s Nickelodeon original programming
Nickelodeon game shows
English-language television shows
First-run syndicated television programs in the United States
Television series by MGM Television
Television series by 20th Century Fox Television
American television series revived after cancellation